This is a list of battalions of the Bedfordshire and Hertfordshire Regiment, which existed as an infantry regiment of the British Army from 1881 to 1958.

Original composition
When the 16th (Bedfordshire) Regiment of Foot became The Bedfordshire Regiment in 1881 under the Cardwell-Childers reforms of the British Armed Forces, five pre-existent militia and volunteer battalions of Bedfordshire and Hertfordshire were integrated into the structure of the regiment. Volunteer battalions had been created in reaction to a perceived threat of invasion by France in the late 1850s. Organised as "rifle volunteer corps", they were independent of the British Army and composed primarily of the middle class. The only change to the regiment's structure during the period of 1881–1908, was the addition of a 4th volunteer battalion in 1900, being the 4th Volunteer Battalion, later renamed to 4th (Huntingdonshire) Volunteer Battalion.

Reorganisation

The Territorial Force (later Territorial Army) was formed in 1908, which the volunteer battalions joined, while the militia battalions transferred to the "Special Reserve". All volunteer battalions were renumbered to create a single sequential order. The Hertfordshire Battalion created during the reforms, left the Bedfordshire Regiment completely in 1909 to create the Hertfordshire Regiment.

First World War

The Bedfordshire Regiment fielded 26 battalions and lost around 7,200 officers and other ranks during the course of the war. The regiment's territorial component formed duplicate second and third line battalions. As an example, the three-line battalions of the 5th Beds were numbered as the 1/5th, 2/5th, and 3/5th respectively. Many battalions of the regiment were formed as part of Secretary of State for War Lord Kitchener's appeal for an initial 100,000 men volunteers in 1914. They were referred to as the New Army or Kitchener's Army. The Volunteer Training Corps were raised with overage or reserved occupation men early in the war, and were initially self-organised into many small corps, with a wide variety of names. Recognition of the corps by the authorities brought regulation and as the war continued the small corps were formed into battalion sized units of the county Volunteer Regiment. In 1918 these were linked to county regiments.

Inter-War
By 1921, all of the regiment's war-raised battalions had disbanded. The Special Reserve reverted to its militia designation in 1921, then to the Supplementary Reserve in 1924; however, its battalions were effectively placed in 'suspended animation'. As World War II approached, the Territorial Army was reorganised in the mid-1930s, many of its infantry battalions were converted to other roles, especially anti-aircraft. The regiment was renamed the Bedfordshire and Hertfordshire Regiment, in 1919, in recognition of the large amounts of soldiers from Hertfordshire that fought in the Great War.

Second World War
The Bedfordshire's expansion during the Second World War was modest compared to 1914–1918. National Defence Companies were combined to create a new "Home Defence" battalion. In addition to this, 23 battalions of the Home Guard were affiliated to the regiment, eight battalions in Bedfordshire wearing the cap badge of Bedfordshire and Hertfordshire Regiment and the 15 battalions in Hertfordshire wearing the cap badge of the Hertfordshire Regiment. A number of Light Anti-Aircraft (LAA) troops were formed from the local battalions to defend specific points, such as factories. Due to the daytime (or shift working) occupations of these men, the batteries required eight times the manpower of an equivalent regular battery.

Post-World War II

In the immediate post-war period, the army was significantly reduced: nearly all infantry regiments had their first and second battalions amalgamated and the Supplementary Reserve disbanded.

Amalgamation
The size of the British Army was reduced following the publication of the 1957 Defence White Paper. A policy of grouping regiments in administrative brigades, and amalgamating pairs of regular battalions was inaugurated. Accordingly, the 1st Battalions of the Bedfordshire and Hertfordshire Regiment and the Essex Regiment were merged to form the 3rd East Anglian Regiment (16th/44th Foot) on 2 June 1958, which itself became part of a new "large regiment": the Royal Anglian Regiment in 1964. The regiment's modern lineage is continued directly by D Company, 2nd Battalion of The Royal Anglian Regiment

References

Bedfordshire and Hertfordshire Regiment, List of battalions
Bedfordshire and Hertfordshire Regiment
Bedfordshire and Hertfordshire Regiment
Battalions